Conejo Recreation and Park District (CRPD) is the park management agency for most of the parks in the Conejo Valley, California. Established in 1962, CRPD later established Conejo Open Space Conservation Agency (COSCA) in 1977 through a joint effort with the City of Thousand Oaks. COSCA administers over 15,000 acres of open space and 140 miles of trails, while CRPD administers over 50 community parks. In 2019, CRPD's annual operating budget was $20 million, of which about 70% comes from property taxes.

It was previously headquartered in the historic 1910 Crowley House, which is City of Thousand Oaks Historical Landmark No. 7. However, CRPD is now housed near Hillcrest Center for the Arts.

History

Conejo Recreation and Park District was established in January 1963 by a vote of Conejo Valley residents. Its first park board consisted of Luther C. Schwich, Roy Dehm, Marvin W, Burow, Donald M. Roberts, and Joan McGillis. One of the agency's first accomplishments was the construction of the valley’s first public swimming pool at Thousand Oaks High School in 1964. The agency received its largest land donation in December 1966, when Potrero Homes donated 1,250 acres of canyon- and mesa lands near California Lutheran University, now known as Wildwood Regional Park. The agency branches out throughout the late 1960s, sponsoring overnight camps, ball games, nature walks, and other activities. The agency made efforts since 1970 aimed at acquiring funds for a swimming pool at Newbury Park High School, which was constructed at the school in 1972. The district purchased the 30-acre Borchard Community Park in Newbury Park in February 1969. The Thousand Oaks Community Center was built in 1971, and the district acquired large parts of Lang Ranch in 1972. Among the last prime pieces of parkland was acquired in the mid 1980s, which included the 240-acre Wildwood Mesa.

The Conejo Open Space Conservation Agency (COSCA), a joint city-park district, was established in 1977 as a joint effort between City of Thousand Oaks and the agency.

List of parks

50 parks are operated in Conejo Valley:

 Banyan Park (Newbury Park, CA)
 Beyer Park
 Borchard Community Park (Newbury Park)
 Canada Park
 Conejo Community Park
 Conejo Creek North Park
 Conejo Creek South Park
 Conejo Creek Southwest Park
 Conejo Creek Equestrian Park
 Conejo Valley Botanic Garden
 Cypress Park (Newbury Park)
 Del Prado Playfield (Newbury Park)
 Dos Vientos Community Park (Newbury Park)
 Dos Vientos Neighborhood Park (Newbury Park)
 El Parque de la Paz
 Estella Park (first public park in Thousand Oaks)
 Evenstar Park
 Fiore Playfield
 Glenwood Park
 Hickory Park (Newbury Park)
 Kimber Park (Newbury Park)
 Lang Ranch Neighborhood Park
 Las Flores Community Garden
 Lynn Oaks Park (Newbury Park)
 Newbury Gateway Park
 North Ranch Neighborhood Park
 North Ranch Playfield
 Northwood Park
 Oakbrook Neighborhood Park
 Oakbrook Regional Park (home of Chumash Indian Museum)
 Old Meadows Park
 Pepper Tree Playfield (Newbury Park)
 Rancho Conejo Playfields (Newbury Park)
 Russell Park
 Sapwi Trails Community Park
 Southshore Hills Park
 Spring Meadow Park
 Stagecoach Inn Park
 Suburbia Park
 Sunset Hills Park
 Sycamore Neighborhood Park (Newbury Park)
 Thousand Oaks Community Park
 Triunfo Park
 Walnut Grove Equestrian Center (Newbury Park)
 Walnut Grove Park (Newbury Park)
 Waverly Park
 Wendy Park (Newbury Park)
 Wildflower Playfield
 Wildwood Neighborhood Park
 Wildwood Regional Park

See also
Conejo Open Space Conservation Agency (COSCA)
Conejo Open Space Foundation (COSF)
Santa Monica Mountains National Recreation Area (SMMNRA)

References

Conejo Valley
Geography of Thousand Oaks, California
Newbury Park, California
Parks in Ventura County, California
Park districts in California
1962 establishments in California